"24 Hrs. to Live" is a song performed by American rapper Mase featuring colleagues The Lox, Black Rob and DMX, taken from his debut album, Harlem World (1997). It was released to radio airwaves on February 20, 1998, as an album cut and managed to chart solely on urban radio airplay. The same year,  an all-female version of the song featuring Queen Pen, Lil' Kim, Foxy Brown and Missy Elliott was discussed; however, plans for the project fell through, resulting in a cancellation. Mase later clarified in an interview that the female version was shelved due to his frustration with Foxy Brown not getting along with Lil' Kim or Queen Pen, also adding that he had "to move on with [his] life."

Music video
Despite the lack of an official single release, the song acquired enough buzz for Mase to film a music video. The video was directed by Nick Quested and premiered on BET in mid-May 1998.

Track listings and formats
12" vinyl
 "24 Hrs. to Live" (Radio Mix) — 4:18   
 "24 Hrs. to Live" (Instrumental) — 4:38   
 "24 Hrs. to Live" (Club Mix) — 4:17   
 "24 Hrs. to Live" (Instrumental) — 4:38

Charts

References 

1997 songs
Mase songs
The Lox songs
DMX (rapper) songs
Songs written by Sean Combs
Songs written by DMX (rapper)
Songs written by Jadakiss
Songs written by Mase
Posse cuts